The Kajang 2 Railway station is a KTM Komuter infill train station located in Kajang 2, Kajang, Selangor. The station is on the KTM Komuter's Seremban Line.

Station features and history
According to the Managing Director of the MKH Berhad, Tan Sri Eddy Chen Lok Loi, the company had purchased  of land in Kajang 2 as early as 2003 and had proposed to the government to jointly develop  of railway reserve land through a smart partnership model. The construction of this railway station is an in-kind contribution received by the Railway Assets Corporation (RAC) as a result of leasing the railway land to Srijang Kemajuan Sdn. Bhd. (SKSB) through a Development Cum Lease Agreement (DCLA) on October 12, 2012. This lease privatization project was approved by the Cabinet on February 8, 2012, with a lease period starting from October 8, 2018 until October 7, 2078. MKH Berhad will be responsible for building a new railway station, which will be handed over to the Railway Assets Corporation as a public facility and operated by the Keretapi Tanah Melayu Berhad (KTMB) for commuter train services.

Eddy Chen also mentioned that the two-story Kajang 2 station is scheduled to be completed in March 2018. It is located between  Station and the  station, near the Terminal Kajang and the Jalan Reko rail section. After the station is operational, passengers can take commuter trains to Kajang Station and transfer to the MRT Kajang Line to head north to Kuala Lumpur. The station's architectural design is by Swan & Maclaren Architects.。

This new train station was built to support the leading development of the  Kajang 2 new township by the local developer, MKH Berhad. Additionally, two to three years after completion, the KTM Mall around the station will also be operational. As of 2017, the construction of the station has already been completed to 40%. The surrounding facilities of the Kajang 2 station include the Rafflesia International School, the Kajang 2 Chinese Primary School built by the company, and a proposed private hospital. The company expects an annual passenger rate of 550,000 people to use the new station. Before the station is operational, MKH has allocated 200 parking spaces on the nearby land for future use, and will combine the multi-storey car park that can accommodate 2,000 parking spaces with the future train station mall.

The station was completed in 2020, but due to the pandemic, it was delayed until now to be put into use.The construction cost of the station due to the pandemic-related factors, has exceeded the budget and reached RM70 million.The station has been operational since March 13, 2023, with 46 train services operating on weekdays and 33 train services operating on weekends and public holidays. The KTM Komuter operates on a current timetable, with a frequency of 30 minutes during peak hours and 60 minutes during off-peak hours. 

Two accessible lifts equivalent to three-storey in height will be installed at both ends of the pedestrian bridge. The parking area will be operated by Srijang Kemajuan Sdn. Bhd. with a maximum fee of RM5.50 per day.
There is another pre-set parking lot with 200 parking spaces located outside the station, which will be open in the future. In order to encourage nearby residents to use the new train station, the parking fee for the first month of opening will be free.

Eddy Chen also mentioned that pedestrian walkways in the residential areas of Kajang 2 will be connected to the train station, and a pedestrian overpass will be built across the railway tracks and Jalan Reko to Bandar Baru Bangi Section 5, allowing pedestrians to walk along a 600-meter shoulder path to the Terminal Kajang, thus realizing the concept of a public transportation hub. Therefore, this is not only convenient for residents of the new township, but also benefits the public.

Bus Services 
Rapid KL trunk route  (Kajang - Lebuh Pudu), MRT Feedr Bus routes  (Stadium Kajang - UKM),  (Stadium Kajang - Teras Jernang) and Smart Selangor  (Kajang - Bandar Baru Bangi) serves the station at Jalan Reko's Plaza Perabot bus stop.

Gallery

References

External links

KTM Komuter Routes

Seremban Line
Railway stations in Selangor